Glutamate receptor, ionotropic, delta 2, also known as GluD2, GluRδ2, or δ2, is a protein that in humans is encoded by the GRID2 gene. This protein together with GluD1 belongs to the delta receptor subtype of ionotropic glutamate receptors. They possess 14–24% sequence homology with AMPA, kainate, and NMDA subunits, but, despite their name, do not actually bind glutamate or various other glutamate agonists.

delta iGluRs have long been considered orphan receptors as their endogenous ligand was unknown. They are now believed to bind glycine and D-serine but these do not result in channel opening.

Function 

GluD2-containing receptors are selectively/predominantly expressed in Purkinje cells in the cerebellum where they play a key role in synaptogenesis, synaptic plasticity, and motor coordination.

GluD2 induces synaptogenesis through interaction of its N-terminal domain with Cbln1, which in turn interacts with presynaptic neurexins, forming a bridge across cerebellar synapses.

The main functions of GluD2 in synaptic plasticity are carried out by its intracellular C-terminus. This is regulated by D-serine, which binds to the ligand-binding domain and results in changes in the structure of GluD2 without opening the channel in the absence of pre-synaptic connections. Glycine and D-serine can open the channel in GluD2 when bound to cerebellin-1 and neurexin-1β. These changes may signal up to the N-terminal domain or down to the C-terminal domain to alter protein-protein interactions.

Pathology 

A heterozygous deletion in GRID2 in humans causes a complicated spastic paraplegia with ataxia, frontotemporal dementia, and lower motor neuron involvement whereas a homozygous biallelic deletion leads to a syndrome of cerebellar ataxia with marked developmental delay, pyramidal tract involvement and tonic upgaze, that can be classified as an ataxia with oculomotor apraxia (AOA) and has been named spinocerebellar ataxia, autosomal recessive type 18 (SCAR18).

A gain of channel function, resulting from a point mutation in mouse GRID2, is associated with the phenotype named 'lurcher', which in the heterozygous state leads to ataxia and motor coordination deficits resulting from selective, cell-autonomous apoptosis of cerebellar Purkinje cells during postnatal development. Mice homozygous for this mutation die shortly after birth from massive loss of mid- and hindbrain neurons during late embryogenesis.

Ligands 

9-Aminoacridine, 9-tetrahydroaminoacridine, N1-dansyl-spermine, N1-dansyl-spermidine, and pentamidine have been shown to act as antagonists of δ2-containing receptors.

Interactions 

GRID2 has been shown to interact with GOPC, GRIK2, PTPN4 and GRIA1. A possible correlation between GRID2 and the pre-B lymphocyte protein 3 (VPREB3) has been suggested, due to the apparent importance of B-lymphocytes in the origins of cerebellar Purkinje neurons in humans. Morphological studies conducted in GRID2-knockout mice suggest that GRID2 may be present in lymphocytes as well as in the adrenal cortex, however further studies must be conducted to confirm these claims.

See also 
 GRID1

References

Further reading 

 
 
 
 
 
 
 
 
 
 
 

Ionotropic glutamate receptors